In 1911, James McKinley, an alderman on Edmonton City Council, resigned his position to protest the firing of two city commissioners.  A by-election to fill the vacancy he left was scheduled for August 14 of that year.  McKinley himself was a candidate, as was Thomas Bellamy.  Bellamy defeated McKinely by a count of 966 votes to 576.

References
City of Edmonton: Edmonton Elections

1911
1911 elections in Canada
1911 in Alberta